The Frozen Faceoff MVP is an annual award given out at the conclusion of the National Collegiate Hockey Conference tournament season to the best player in the championship as voted by the coaches of each NCHC team.

The Frozen Faceoff MVP was first awarded in 2014 and is a successor to the CCHA Most Valuable Player in Tournament which was discontinued after the conference dissolved due to the 2013–14 NCAA conference realignment.

Award winners

Winners by school

Winners by position

See also
NCHC Awards

References

External links

College ice hockey trophies and awards in the United States